Ludwikowo  is a village in the administrative district of Gmina Brodnica, within Śrem County, Greater Poland Voivodeship, in west-central Poland. The Eastern end of the Żabińskie Mountains reaches here. From 1975 to 1998, Ludwikowo administratively belonged to Poznań Voivodeship.

References

Villages in Śrem County